Bryan Gioè (born 6 July 1993) is an Italian footballer who plays as a forward for Adriese in Serie D.

Career

Giana Erminio
On 7 December 2019, Gioè's contract with Giana Erminio was terminated by mutual consent.

References

External links

1993 births
Living people
F.C. Pavia players
F.C. Grosseto S.S.D. players
A.C. Tuttocuoio 1957 San Miniato players
U.S. Città di Pontedera players
A.S. Giana Erminio players
S.S. Arezzo players
Serie C players
Serie D players
Italian footballers
Association football forwards
Sportspeople from Lucca
Pinerolo F.C. players
Footballers from Tuscany